Pasi Pentti Rautiainen (born 18 July 1961) is Finnish football manager and former player. He has  coached PK-35, FC Jokerit and FC KooTeePee in Finland and FC Levadia Tallinn and FC Flora Tallinn in Estonia. His last club was TPS.

Rautiainen was very talented as a young player, and he joined Bayern Munich at the age of just 18 in 1980. He only made one appearance for the club, but was still named German champion with Bayern in the 1980–81 season. Rautiainen later made 115 appearances in the Bundesliga for Werder Bremen (1981–82) and Arminia Bielefeld (1982–1985), scoring 14 goals. He also played in the 2. Bundesliga for Bielefeld and SG Wattenscheid 09. In Finland Rautiainen played for HJK Helsinki, winning the Finnish championship in 1978 and 1990. He also earned 25 caps for the Finland national football team, scoring once. 1982 the sports journalists of his home country elected him Finnish Footballer of the Year.

Rautiainen is also a popular football pundit in Finland. He's known for his energetic and enthusiastic behavior when talking about anything concerning football. He commented UEFA Champions League games for the TV channel Nelonen. In the 2003–04 season, he promised he'd walk from Helsinki to Porvoo (some 50 kilometres) if Deportivo were able to knock A.C. Milan out in the quarter finals which indeed happened. He never wore socks even when live on TV. He was also featured on the broadcasts of Estonian channel ETV during the 2006 World Cup. Now he works as a studio commentator in Finland's national team matches. He also continues to work as studio commentator for Champions League and English Premier League broadcasts.

References

1961 births
Living people
Footballers from Helsinki
Finnish footballers
Finnish expatriate footballers
Finland international footballers
Finnish football managers
Association football midfielders
Helsingin Jalkapalloklubi players
FC Bayern Munich footballers
SV Werder Bremen players
Arminia Bielefeld players
SG Wattenscheid 09 players
Expatriate footballers in Germany
Finnish expatriate sportspeople in Germany
FC Flora managers
FCI Levadia Tallinn managers
TPS Turku football managers
Bundesliga players
2. Bundesliga players
Expatriate football managers in Estonia
21st-century Finnish people
Finnish expatriate sportspeople in Estonia